Mick Lawler is an Irish former sportsperson. He played hurling with his local club Coon. He played midfield in their victory in the 1967 Junior County final against Knocktopher. This was the first hurling title ever for that club. He was a member of the Kilkenny senior inter-county team from 1969 until 1971. With Kilkenny Lawler won an All-Ireland title and two Leinster titles. He was the first representative from the Coon club to play in an All Ireland hurling final. He later went on to play inter-county hurling for Wicklow.

References

Living people
All-Ireland Senior Hurling Championship winners
Kilkenny inter-county hurlers
St Martin's (Kilkenny) hurlers
Wicklow inter-county hurlers
Year of birth missing (living people)